Ian Mulder is a Dutch-born pianist and composer, who lives in Orlando, Florida. He performs in the United States and Europe, playing the piano and conducting an orchestra simultaneously, and has 20 solo albums to his name. His inspirational CDs Love Divine 1, 2, 3, 4, 5, 6 and 7, recorded with the London Symphony Orchestra, Royal Philharmonic Orchestra, and London Philharmonic Orchestra are popular in over 20 countries and have achieved gold and platinum status.

Biography
Mulder was born in Rotterdam; he studied piano, organ and composition at the Rotterdam and Utrecht conservatories. Since graduating in 1992, Ian Mulder composes music for his solo albums and concerts. His piano albums, recorded with symphony orchestras in London and Moscow, are frequently played on Sirius XM, Classic FM and other stations.

In 2013, he recorded his second album with the London Symphony Orchestra, Love Divine, which reached platinum status 10 weeks from its release date. That same album was nominated for the 2014 GMA Dove Awards: Instrumental Album of the Year. His 2014 album with the London Symphony Orchestra, named Christmas, featured Andrea Bocelli singing "A choir of a thousand angels". In 2021, the album Love Divine VII was released, featuring the Royal Philharmonic Orchestra.

Career highlights

 Compositions: 1093
 CDs: 210
 Record Company: Miller Music USA / Universal
 Dove Award Nominations: 1
 International Award: 1
 Gold and Platinum Records: 5
 CDs and DVDs sold: 1 million
 Musical style: inspirational, romantic, light classical, film music

Discography
 Ecossaise (2000)
 Ecossaise 2 (2001)
 Ecossaise Christmas (2002)
 The Best of Ecossaise (2003)
 Grandezza (2003)
 Ocean of Dreams (2006)
 Coming to America (2008)
 Ian Mulder in Concert (2009)
 Ian Mulder's favourite Hymns (2010)
 The Piano Dreamer (2011)
 Sounds of Silence (2012)
 Love Divine (2013)
 Christmas (2014)
 Love Divine II (2015)
 Love Divine III (2016)
 Love Divine IV (2017)
 Love Divine V (2018)
 Ocean of Dreams 2 (2018)
 Love Divine VI (2019)
 Love Divine VII (2021)

DVDs
 Ian Mulder in Concert (2009)

References

External links

 

Living people
Dutch composers
Dutch conductors (music)
Male conductors (music)
Dutch pianists
Musicians from Rotterdam
Dutch emigrants to the United States
21st-century conductors (music)
21st-century pianists
21st-century male musicians
1963 births